Thompson García (born December 16, 1970) is a former boxer from Ecuador, competing in the heavyweight (> 91 kg) division. He was born in Esmeraldas.

Amateur
Garcia won the Light heavyweight silver medal at the 1995 Pan American Games, where he lost the final to Antonio Tarver of the United States.

He represented his native country at heavyweight at the 1996 Summer Olympics in Atlanta, Georgia, where he lost to Georgi Kandelaki.

Pro
He turned pro in 1999 at Cruiser but lost his first fight and retired the next year with a 3-2 record.

External links
 

1970 births
Living people
Light-heavyweight boxers
Boxers at the 1996 Summer Olympics
Olympic boxers of Ecuador
Boxers at the 1995 Pan American Games
Sportspeople from Esmeraldas, Ecuador
Ecuadorian male boxers
Pan American Games silver medalists for Ecuador
Pan American Games medalists in boxing
Medalists at the 1995 Pan American Games